Geordie Jay Robertson (born August 1, 1959) is a Canadian former professional ice hockey centre. He played in five games in the National Hockey League with the Buffalo Sabres during the 1982–83 season. The rest of his career, which lasted from 1979 to 1989, was mainly spent in the minor American Hockey League.

Biography
Born in Victoria, British Columbia, Roberston is the brother of Torrie Robertson. As a youth, Robertson played in the 1971 Quebec International Pee-Wee Hockey Tournament with a minor ice hockey team from Victoria.

He played in five games in the National Hockey League with the Buffalo Sabres during the 1982–83 season, going one goal and adding two assists.

Robertson was the leading scorer on two American Hockey League Calder Cup-winning teams, the 1982–83 Rochester Americans and the 1985–86 Adirondack Red Wings. He was the Coach of the varsity hockey team at Monroe Community College in Rochester, New York from 2000–04. In 1993, he was inducted into the Rochester Americans Hall of Fame.

Career statistics

Regular season and playoffs

References

External links
 

1959 births
Living people
Adirondack Red Wings players
Buffalo Sabres players
Canadian expatriate ice hockey players in Finland
Canadian ice hockey centres
Ice hockey people from British Columbia
Nanaimo Clippers players
JYP Jyväskylä players
Rochester Americans players
Sportspeople from Victoria, British Columbia
Undrafted National Hockey League players
Victoria Cougars (WHL) players